The 1971 UTEP Miners football team was an American football team that represented the University of Texas at El Paso in the Western Athletic Conference during the 1971 NCAA University Division football season. In their seventh year under head coach Bobby Dobbs, the team compiled a 5–6 record.

Schedule

References

UTEP
UTEP Miners football seasons
UTEP Miners football